Karlgarin is a town located  south-east of Perth in the eastern Wheatbelt region of Western Australia. A small traditional farming town, in 2010 Karlgarin made national papers, as the poorest town in Western Australia, with an average of $34,054 taxable income.

The first European to visit the area was Surveyor General John Septimus Roe, who passed through in 1848. He recorded the name "Carlgarin" as the name of a nearby hill. the town name, Karlgarin, was derived from the Noongar word, karl, meaning fire.
Karlgarin was selected as a soldier settlement site and a declaration of a townsite was sought in 1924. It was not until 1930 that the railway came to the area. The townsite was gazetted in 1931.

Economy 
According to 2011 census data, 57.3% of Karlgarin residents are employed in sheep, beef cattle and grain farming. The surrounding areas also produce wheat and other cereal crops. The town is a receival site for Cooperative Bulk Handling.

Facilities 
As well as the Cooperative Bulk Handling site to support the booming grain industry, Karlgarin townsite has an abandoned school and shop, both of which were destroyed during a storm in 2013. The main hub of the community is the Karlgarin Country Club, established in 1953. Located on Foundation Street, it sells food and a range of drinks. A large portion of the revenue for "The Club", as it is commonly known, comes from the associated bowls club.

As well as the club, Karlgarin offers a diverse range of food options, including a burger van. In 2015 Karlgarin welcomed a new cafe and art gallery at the old CWA building.

Other facilities offered in Karlgarin include the Church of Our Lady Help of Christians Catholic Church Karlgarin. The church's foundation stone was laid by Rev. Myles McKeon on 13 March 1966. On the main street, Melba Street, is the abandoned school, opened in 1932 and closed in 2005.

Tourism 
Karlgarin is home to the annual gilgie races. The town's proximity to Hyden and Wave Rock, along with its location on the Brookton Highway, means reliable tourism potential. To capitalise on this, the Trestrail family opened Tressie's Museum and Caravan Park.

Sport 
Tucked away behind the Cooperative Bulk Handling, Karlgarin has a small cricket oval, used by the combined Karlgarin and Pingaring cricket team. The town also shares a football team with Hyden, the Hyden/Karlgarin Football Club, which competes in the Eastern Districts Football League, and hockey and netball team shares a hockey team, both shared with Hyden.

2013 storm 
Only  of rain fell but trees were uprooted and roofs were torn off buildings, including the local school, general store and church. Twelve buildings were damaged and the town has never fully recovered.

References 

Towns in Western Australia
Australian soldier settlements
Grain receival points of Western Australia
1931 establishments in Australia
Shire of Kondinin